This is a list of Billboard magazine's Top Hot 100 songs of 1976. The Top 100, as revealed in the year-end edition of Billboard dated December 25, 1976, is based on Hot 100 charts from the issue dates of November 8, 1975 through October 30, 1976.

See also
1976 in music
List of Billboard Hot 100 number-one singles of 1976
List of Billboard Hot 100 top-ten singles in 1976

References

1976 record charts
Billboard charts